El precio de la fama (English title: The price of fame) is a Mexican telenovela produced by Ernesto Alonso for Televisa in 1987.

Sonia Infante and Sergio Goyri starred as protagonists, while José Alonso starred as main antagonist.

Plot 
Lucrecía is a famous and successful actress of telenovelas, but has reached the pinnacle of success using men. In her youth, the unmarried Lucrecia had a daughter. To avoid tarnishing her image with a scandal, she gave the child to her spinster sister Agnes to pass off as hers. After a long time, Lucrecia gets close to her "niece" Sonia, but the girl is only interested in what her relative can give her.

Cast 

Sonia Infante as Lucrecia Aguilar Prado Castañeda
Sergio Goyri as Jaime Garay
José Alonso as Sergio Ferrer
Susana Alexander as Inés
Eric del Castillo as Alfonso Bernal
Stephanie Salas as Sonia
 Andrea Ferrari as Manola
Gabriela Goldsmith as Cecilia
Felicia Mercado as Doris
María Rivas as Mercedes
Elsa Cárdenas as Eloísa de Bernal
Eduardo Liñán as Eugenio Ferrer
José Antonio Ferral as Bernardo
Jerardo as Fernando Bernal
Guillermo Aguilar as David
Tony Bravo as Antonio
Gilberto Román as Guillermo
Paola Cano as Sonia (child)
Juan Zaizar as Joel
Juan Diego as Benito
Melba Luna as Esther
Rosa Salazar as Renata
Mary Fernández as Rosa
Miguel Ángel Negrete as Raúl
Rocío Yaber as Secretary
Roberto Vander

Awards

References

External links 

Mexican telenovelas
1987 telenovelas
Televisa telenovelas
Spanish-language telenovelas
1987 Mexican television series debuts
1987 Mexican television series endings